The gauss, symbol  (sometimes Gs), is a unit of measurement of magnetic induction, also known as magnetic flux density. The unit is part of the Gaussian system of units, which inherited it from the older CGS-EMU system. It was named after the German mathematician and physicist Carl Friedrich Gauss in 1936. One gauss is defined as one maxwell per square centimetre.

As the cgs system has been superseded by the International System of Units (SI), the use of the gauss has been deprecated by the standards bodies, but is still regularly used in various subfields of science.

Name, symbol, and metric prefixes
Albeit not a component of the International System of Units, the usage of the gauss generally follows the rules for SI units. Since the name is derived from a person's name, its symbol is the uppercase letter G. When the unit is spelled out, it is written in lowercase ("gauss"), unless it begins a sentence.  The gauss may be combined with metric prefixes, such as in milligauss, mG (or mGs), or kilogauss, kGauss or kG.

Unit conversions

The gauss is the unit of magnetic flux density B in the system of Gaussian units and is equal to Mx/cm2 or g/Bi/s2, while the oersted is the unit of -field. One tesla (T) corresponds to 104 gauss, and one ampere (A) per metre corresponds to 4π × 10−3 oersted. 

The units for magnetic flux Φ, which is the integral of magnetic -field over an area, are the weber (Wb) in the SI and the maxwell (Mx) in the CGS-Gaussian system.

Typical values

 10−9–10−8 G – the magnetic field of the human brain
 10−6–10−3 G – the magnetic field of Galactic molecular clouds. Typical magnetic field strengths within the interstellar medium of the Milky Way are ~5 μG.
 0.25–0.60 G – the Earth's magnetic field at its surface
 4 G – near Jupiter's equator
 25 G – the Earth's magnetic field in its core
 50 G – a typical refrigerator magnet
 100 G – an iron magnet
 1500 G – within a sun spot
 10000 to 13000 G – remanence of a neodymium-iron-boron (NIB) magnet
 16000 to 22000 G – saturation of high permeability iron alloys used in transformers
 3000–70000 G – a medical magnetic resonance imaging machine 
 1012–1013 G – the surface of a neutron star
 4 × 1013 G – the Schwinger limit
 1014 G – the magnetic field of SGR J1745-2900, orbiting the supermassive black hole Sgr A* in the center of the Milky Way.
 1015 G – the magnetic field of some newly created magnetars
 1017 G – the upper limit to neutron star magnetism

See also
Tesla (unit)
Centimetre–gram–second system of units
Gaussian units

Notes

References

Centimetre–gram–second system of units
Units of magnetic flux density
Unit